A hot air balloon is a lighter-than-air aircraft consisting of a bag, called an envelope, which contains heated air. Suspended beneath is a gondola or wicker basket (in some long-distance or high-altitude balloons, a capsule), which carries passengers and a source of heat, in most cases an open flame caused by burning liquid propane. The heated air inside the envelope makes it buoyant, since it has a lower density than the colder air outside the envelope. As with all aircraft, hot air balloons cannot fly beyond the atmosphere. The envelope does not have to be sealed at the bottom, since the air inside the envelope is at about the same pressure as the surrounding air. In modern sport balloons the envelope is generally made from nylon fabric, and the inlet of the balloon (closest to the burner flame) is made from a fire-resistant material such as Nomex. Modern balloons have been made in many shapes, such as rocket ships and the shapes of various commercial products, though the traditional shape is used for most non-commercial and many commercial applications.

The hot air balloon is the first successful human-carrying flight technology. The first untethered manned hot air balloon flight was performed by Jean-François Pilâtre de Rozier and François Laurent d'Arlandes on November 21, 1783, in Paris, France, in a balloon created by the Montgolfier brothers. The first hot air balloon flown in the Americas was launched from the Walnut Street Jail in Philadelphia on January 9, 1793, by the French aeronaut Jean Pierre Blanchard. Hot air balloons that can be propelled through the air rather than simply drifting with the wind are known as thermal airships.

History

Premodern and unmanned balloons

A precursor of the hot air balloon was the sky lantern. Zhuge Liang of the Shu Han kingdom, during the Three Kingdoms era (220–280 CE), used these airborne lanterns for military signaling.

In the 18th century the colonial Brazilian Jesuit priest Bartolomeu de Gusmão envisioned an aerial apparatus called , which was the predecessor of the hot air balloon. In 1709 John V of Portugal decided to fund Bartolomeu de Gusmão's project following a petition made by the Jesuit priest, and an unmanned demonstration was performed at Casa da India in presence of John V, the queen Maria Anna of Austria, having as witnesses the Italian cardinal Michelangelo Conti, two members of the Portuguese Royal Academy of History, one Portuguese diplomat and one chronicler. This event would bring some European attention to this event and this project. A later article dated on October 20, 1786, by the London Daily Universal Register would state that the inventor was able to raise himself by the use of his prototype. Also in 1709, the Portuguese Jesuit wrote  (Short Manifesto for those who are unaware that is possible to sail through the element air); he also left designs for a manned air vessel.

The notable balloonist Julian Nott, in the 1970s; hypothesized that two millennia ago, the Nazca Lines geoglyphs' creation could have been guided by Nazca leaders in a balloon, possibly the earliest hot air balloon flights in human history.   In 1975 to support this theory, he designed and piloted the Nazca Prehistoric Balloon, claiming to have used only methods and materials available to the Pre-Inca Peruvians 1,000 years ago.

First manned flight

The French brothers Joseph-Michel and Jacques-Étienne Montgolfier developed a hot-air balloon in Annonay, Ardeche, France, and demonstrated it publicly on September 19, 1783, making an unmanned flight lasting 10 minutes. After experimenting with unmanned balloons and flights with animals, the first balloon flight with humans aboard, a tethered flight, performed on or around October 15, 1783, by Jean-Francois Pilatre de Rozier, who made at least one tethered flight from the yard of the Reveillon workshop in the Faubourg Saint-Antoine. The first free flight with human passengers was made a few weeks later, on November 21, 1783. King Louis XVI had originally decreed that condemned criminals would be the first pilots, but de Rozier, along with Marquis François d'Arlandes, petitioned successfully for the honor.
The first military use of a hot air balloon happened in 1794 during the battle of Fleurus, when the French used the balloon  for observation.

Jean-Pierre Blanchard became the first person to fly a hot air balloon in various countries, including the United States, the Netherlands, and Germany. His most notable flight crossed the English Channel heading to the Dover Castle accompanied by Dr. John Jeffries, which occurred on 7 January 1785. In 1808, Blanchard suffered a heart attack while ballooning above The Hague, fell from his balloon, and experienced fatal injuries. His wife Sophie Blanchard continued his profession, but also died a decade later on a balloon, due to a firework festival causing the hydrogen in the balloon to be set on fire.

Modern balloons

Modern hot air balloons, with an onboard heat source, were developed by Ed Yost, beginning during the 1950s; his work resulted in his first successful flight on October 22, 1960. The first modern hot air balloon to be made in the United Kingdom (UK) was the Bristol Belle, built in 1967. Presently, hot air balloons are used primarily for recreation.

Records
Hot air balloons are able to fly to extremely high altitudes. On November 26, 2005 Vijaypat Singhania set the world altitude record for highest hot air balloon flight, reaching . The previous record of  had been set by Per Lindstrand on June 6, 1988, in Plano, Texas.

On January 15, 1991, the Virgin Pacific Flyer balloon completed the longest flight in a hot air balloon, when Per Lindstrand (born in Sweden, but resident in the UK) and Richard Branson of the UK flew  from Japan to Northern Canada. With a volume of 74,000 cubic meters (2.6 million cubic feet), the balloon envelope was the largest ever built for a hot air craft. The longest duration record was set by Swiss psychiatrist Bertrand Piccard (Auguste Piccard's grandson) and Briton Brian Jones, flying in the Breitling Orbiter 3. It was the first nonstop trip around the world by balloon. The two men exceeded distance, endurance, and time records, traveling 19 days, 21 hours, and 55 minutes. Steve Fossett, flying solo, exceeded the record for briefest time traveling around the world on 3 July 2002 on his sixth attempt, in 320 h 33 min. Fedor Konyukhov flew solo round the world on his first attempt in a hybrid hot air/helium balloon from 11 to 23 July 2016 for a round-the world time of 268 h 20 min.

Construction
A hot air balloon for manned flight uses a single-layered, fabric gas bag (lifting "envelope"), with an opening at the bottom called the mouth or throat. Attached to the envelope is a basket, or gondola, for carrying the passengers. Mounted above the basket and centered in the mouth is the "burner", which injects a flame into the envelope, heating the air within. The heater or burner is fueled by propane, a liquefied gas stored in pressure vessels, similar to high-pressure forklift cylinders.

Envelope
Modern hot air balloons are usually made of materials such as ripstop nylon or dacron (a polyester).

During the manufacturing process, the material is cut into panels and sewn together, along with structural load tapes that carry the weight of the gondola or basket. The individual sections, which extend from the throat to the crown (top) of the envelope, are known as gores or gore sections. Envelopes can have as few as 4 gores or as many as 24 or more.

Envelopes often have a crown ring at their very top. Vertical load tapes from the envelope are attached to the crown ring.

At the bottom of the envelope the vertical load tapes are sewn into loops that are connected to cables (one cable per load tape). These cables, often referred to as flying wires, are connected to the basket by carabiners.

Seams
The most common technique for sewing panels together is called the French felled, French fell, or double lap seam. The two pieces of fabric are folded over on each other at their common edge, possibly with a load tape as well, and sewn together with two rows of parallel stitching. Other methods include a flat lap seam, in which the two pieces of fabric are held together simply with two rows of parallel stitching, and a zigzag, where parallel zigzag stitching holds a double lap of fabric.

Coatings

The fabric (or at least part of it, the top 1/3, for example) may be coated with a sealer, such as silicone or polyurethane, to make it impermeable to air. It is often the degradation of this coating and the corresponding loss of impermeability that ends the effective life of an envelope, not weakening of the fabric itself. Heat, moisture, and mechanical wear-and-tear during set-up and pack-up are the primary causes of degradation. Once an envelope becomes too porous to fly, it may be retired and discarded or perhaps used as a "rag bag": cold-inflated and opened for children to run through. Products for recoating the fabric are becoming available commercially.

Sizes and capacity
A range of envelope sizes is available.

Vents

The top of the balloon usually has a vent of some sort, enabling the pilot to release hot air to slow an ascent, start a descent, or increase the rate of descent, usually for landing. Some hot air balloons have turning vents, which are side vents that, when opened, cause the balloon to rotate. Such vents are particularly useful for balloons with rectangular baskets, to facilitate aligning the wider side of the basket for landing.

The most common type of top vent is a disk-shaped flap of fabric called a parachute vent, invented by Tracy Barnes. The fabric is connected around its edge to a set of "vent lines" that converge in the center. (The arrangement of fabric and lines roughly resembles a parachute—thus the name.) These "vent lines" are themselves connected to a control line that runs to the basket. A parachute vent is opened by pulling on the control line. Once the control line is released, the pressure of the remaining hot air pushes the vent fabric back into place. A parachute vent can be opened briefly while in flight to initiate a rapid descent. (Slower descents are initiated by allowing the air in the balloon to cool naturally.) The vent is pulled open completely to collapse the balloon after landing.

An older, and presently less commonly used, style of top vent is called a "Velcro-style" vent. This too is a disk of fabric at the top of the balloon. However, rather than having a set of "vent lines" that can repeatedly open and close the vent, the vent is secured by "hook and loop" fasteners (such as Velcro) and is only opened at the end of the flight. Balloons equipped with a Velcro-style vent typically have a second "maneuvering vent" built into the side (as opposed to the top) of the balloon.  Another common type of top design is the "smart vent", which, rather than lowering a fabric disc into the envelope as in the "parachute" type, gathers the fabric together in the center of the opening.  This system can theoretically be used for in-flight maneuvering, but is more commonly used only as a rapid-deflation device for use after landing, of particular value in high winds. Other designs, such as the "pop top" and "MultiVent" systems, have also attempted to address the need for rapid deflation on landing, but the parachute top remains popular as an all-around maneuvering and deflation system.

Shape
Besides special shapes, possibly for marketing purposes, there are several variations on the traditional "inverted tear drop" shape. The simplest, often used by home builders, is a hemisphere on top of a truncated cone. More sophisticated designs attempt to minimize the circumferential stress on the fabric, with different degrees of success depending on whether they take fabric weight and varying air density into account. This shape may be referred to as "natural". Finally, some specialized balloons are designed to minimize aerodynamic drag (in the vertical direction) to improve flight performance in competitions.

Basket

Hot air balloon baskets are commonly made of woven wicker or rattan. These materials have proven to be sufficiently light, strong, and durable for balloon flight. Such baskets are usually rectangular or triangular in shape. They vary in size from just big enough for two people to large enough to carry thirty. Larger baskets often have internal partitions for structural bracing and to compartmentalize the passengers. Small holes may be woven into the side of the basket to act as foot holds for passengers climbing in or out.

Baskets may also be made of aluminium, especially a collapsible aluminium frame with a fabric skin, to reduce weight or increase portability. These may be used by pilots without a ground crew or who are attempting to set altitude, duration, or distance records. Other specialty baskets include the fully enclosed gondolas used for around-the-world attempts and baskets that consist of little more than a seat for the pilot and perhaps one passenger.

Burner

The burner unit gasifies liquid propane, mixes it with air, ignites the mixture, and directs the flame and exhaust into the mouth of the envelope. Burners vary in power output; each will generally produce 2 to 3 MW of heat (7 to 10 million BTUs per hour), with double, triple, or quadruple burner configurations installed where more power is needed. The pilot actuates a burner by opening a propane valve, known as a blast valve. The valve may be spring-loaded, so that it closes automatically, or it may stay open until closed by the pilot. The burner has a pilot light to ignite the propane and air mixture. The pilot light may be lit by the pilot with an external device, such as a flint striker or a lighter, or with a built-in piezoelectric spark.

Where more than one burner is present, the pilot can use one or more at a time, depending on the desired heat output. Each burner has a metal coil of propane tubing the flame shoots through to preheat the incoming liquid propane. The burner unit may be suspended from the mouth of the envelope or supported rigidly over the basket. The burner unit may be mounted on a gimbal to enable the pilot to aim the flame and avoid overheating the envelope fabric. A burner may have a secondary propane valve that releases propane more slowly and thereby generates a different sound. This is called a whisper burner and is used for flight over livestock to lessen the chance of spooking them. It also generates a more yellow flame and is used for night glows because it lights up the inside of the envelope better than the primary valve.

Fuel tanks
Propane fuel tanks are usually cylindrical pressure vessels made from aluminium, stainless steel, or titanium with a valve at one end to feed the burner and to refuel. They may have a fuel gauge and a pressure gauge. They may be intended for upright or horizontal use and may be mounted inside or outside the basket.

The pressure necessary to force the fuel through the line to the burner may be supplied by the vapor pressure of the propane itself, if warm enough, or by the introduction of an inert gas such as nitrogen. Tanks may be preheated with electrical heat tapes to produce sufficient vapor pressure for cold-weather flying. Warmed tanks are usually also wrapped in an insulating blanket to preserve heat during the setup and flight.

Instrumentation
A balloon may be outfitted with a variety of instruments to aid the pilot. These commonly include an altimeter, a rate-of-climb (vertical-speed) indicator known as a variometer, envelope (air) temperature, and ambient (air) temperature. A GPS receiver can be useful to indicate ground speed (traditional aircraft air-speed indicators would be useless) and direction.

Combined mass
The combined mass of an average system can be calculated as follows:
 {| class="wikitable"
|-
! Component
! Pounds
! Kilograms
! Mass fraction
|-
|  envelope
| align="right" |250
| align="right" |113.4
| 
|-
| 5-passenger basket
| align="right" |140
| align="right" |63.5
| 
|-
| Double burner
| align="right" |50
| align="right" |22.7
| 
|-
| 3  fuel tanks full of propane
| align="right" |3 × 135 = 405
| align="right" |183.7
| 
|-
| 5 passengers
| align="right" |5 × 150 = 750
| align="right" |340.2
| 
|-
| Subtotal
| align="right" |1595
| align="right" |723.5
| 
|-
|  of heated air*
| align="right" |5922
| align="right" |2686.2
| 
|-
| Total
| align="right" |(3.76 tons) 7517
| align="right" |3409.7
| 
|}

Theory of operation

Generating lift
Increasing the air temperature inside the envelope makes it less dense than the surrounding (ambient) air. The balloon floats because of the buoyant force exerted on it. This force is the same force that acts on objects when they are in water and is described by Archimedes' principle. The amount of lift (or buoyancy) provided by a hot air balloon depends primarily upon the difference between the temperature of the air inside the envelope and the temperature of the air outside the envelope. For most envelopes made of nylon fabric, the maximal internal temperature is limited to approximately 120 °C (250 °F).

The melting point of nylon is significantly greater than this maximal operating temperature — about 230 °C (450 °F) — but higher temperatures cause the strength of the nylon fabric to degrade more quickly over time. With a maximal operating temperature of 120 °C (250 °F), balloon envelopes can generally be flown for between 400 and 500 hours before the fabric needs to be replaced. Many balloon pilots operate their envelopes at temperatures significantly less than the maximum to extend envelope-fabric life.

 {| class="wikitable"
|-
! Air temperature
! Air density
! Air mass
! Lift generated
|-
| 
| 
| 
| 0 lb, 0 kg
|-
| 
| 
| 
| 
|-
| 
| 
| 
| 
|}

The total lift for a balloon of  heated to  would be . This is just enough to generate neutral buoyancy for the total system mass (not including the heated air trapped in the envelope, of course) stated in the previous section. Liftoff would require a slightly greater temperature, depending on the desired rate of climb. In reality, the air contained in the envelope is not all at the same temperature, as the accompanying thermal image shows, and so these calculations are based on averages.

For typical atmospheric conditions, a hot air balloon heated to  requires about 3.91 m3 of envelope volume to lift 1 kilogram (equivalently, 62.5 cu ft/lb). The precise amount of lift provided depends not only upon the internal temperature mentioned above, but the external temperature, altitude above sea level, and humidity of the air surrounding. On a warm day, a balloon cannot lift as much as on a cool day, because the temperature required for launch will exceed the maximum sustainable for nylon envelope fabric. Also, in the lower atmosphere, the lift provided by a hot air balloon decreases about 3% per 1,000 m (1% per 1,000 ft) of altitude gained.

Montgolfier

Standard hot air balloons are known as Montgolfier balloons and rely solely on the buoyancy of hot air provided by the burner and contained by the envelope. This style of balloon was developed by the Montgolfier brothers and had its first public demonstration on 4 June 1783 with an unmanned flight lasting 10 minutes, followed later that year with manned flights.

Hybrid
The 1785 Rozière balloon, a type of hybrid balloon, named after its creator, Jean-François Pilâtre de Rozier, has a separate cell for a lighter-than-air gas (typically helium), as well as a cone below for hot air (as is used in a hot air balloon) to heat the helium at night. Hydrogen gas was used in the very early stages of development, but was quickly abandoned due to the danger of introducing an open flame near the gas. All modern Roziere balloons now use helium as a lifting gas.

Solar

Solar balloons are hot air balloons that use just solar energy captured by a dark envelope to heat the air inside.

Steering
Hot air balloon can be steered to a limited degree by changing the altitude of the flight. Wind in the northern hemisphere tends to turn east due to coriolis effect as the altitude increases.

Safety equipment

To help ensure the safety of pilot and passengers, a hot air balloon may carry several pieces of safety equipment.

In the basket
To relight the burner if the pilot light goes out and the optional piezo ignition fails, the pilot should have ready access to a means of backup ignition, such as a flint spark lighter. Many systems, especially those that carry passengers, have completely duplicate fuel and burner systems: two fuel tanks, connected to two separate hoses, which feed two distinct burners. This enables a safe landing in the case of a blockage somewhere in one system or if a system must be disabled because of a fuel leak.

A fire extinguisher suitable for extinguishing propane fires is useful. Most balloons carry a 1 or 2 kg AB:E type fire extinguisher.

A handling or drop line is mandatory safety equipment in many countries. This is a rope or webbing of 20–30 meters in length attached to the balloon basket with a quick-release connection at one end. In very calm winds the balloon pilot can throw the handling line from the balloon so that the ground crew can guide the balloon safely away from obstructions on the ground.

For commercial passenger balloons, a pilot restraint harness is mandatory in some countries. This consists of a hip belt and a webbing line that together allow for some movement while preventing the pilot from being ejected from the basket during a hard landing.

Further safety equipment may include a first-aid kit, a fire blanket and a strong rescue knife.

On the occupants
At a minimum, the pilot should wear leather or flame-retardant fiber (such as nomex) gloves, so that they may shut off a gas valve in the case of a leak, even if there is a flame present; quick action in this regard can turn a potential catastrophe into a mere inconvenience. The pilot should additionally wear flame-resistant clothing covering their arms and legs; either natural fiber, such as cotton, linen, hemp, or wool, or engineered flame-retardant fiber, such as nomex, is acceptable in this capacity. Most engineered fibers (with the exception of rayon, which is also safe to wear) are thermoplastic; many are also hydrocarbons. This makes such fabrics very much unsuitable to wear near high temperatures, since non-flame-retardant thermoplastics will melt onto the wearer, and most hydrocarbons, whether fibrous or not, are suitable to use as fuels. Natural fiber will singe rather than melt or burn readily, and flame-retardant fiber generally has a very high melting point and is intrinsically non-flammable. Many pilots also advise their passengers to wear similar protective clothing that covers their arms and legs, as well as strong shoes or boots that offer good ankle support. Finally, some balloon systems, especially those that hang the burner from the envelope instead of supporting it rigidly from the basket, require the use of helmets by the pilot and passengers.

On the ground crew
The ground crew should wear gloves whenever there is a possibility of handling ropes or lines. The mass and exposed surface to air movement of a medium-sized balloon is sufficient to cause rope friction burns to the hands of anyone trying to stop or prevent movement. The ground crew should also wear sturdy shoes and at least long pants in case of the need to access a landing or landed balloon in rough or overgrown terrain.

Maintenance and repair

As with aircraft, hot air balloons require regular maintenance to remain airworthy. As aircraft made of fabric and that lack direct horizontal control, hot air balloons may occasionally require repairs to rips or snags. While some operations, such as cleaning and drying, may be performed by the owner or pilot, other operations, such as sewing, must be performed by a qualified repair technician and recorded in the balloon's maintenance log book.

Maintenance
To ensure long life and safe operation, the envelope should be kept clean and dry. This prevents mold and mildew from forming on the fabric and abrasion from occurring during packing, transport, and unpacking due to contact with foreign particles. In the event of a landing in a wet (because of precipitation or early morning or late evening dew) or muddy location (farmer's field), the envelope should be cleaned and laid out or hung to dry.

The burner and fuel system must also be kept clean to ensure safe operation on demand. Damaged fuel hoses need to be replaced. Stuck or leaky valves must be repaired or replaced. The wicker basket may require occasional refinishing or repair. The skids on its bottom may require occasional replacement.

Balloons in most parts of the world are maintained in accordance with a fixed manufacturer's maintenance schedule that includes regular (100 flight hours or 12 month) inspections, in addition to maintenance work to correct any damage. In Australia, balloons used for carrying commercial passengers must be inspected and maintained by approved workshops.

Repair
In the case of a snag, burn, or rip in the envelope fabric, a patch may be applied or the affected panel completely replaced. Patches may be held in place with glue, tape, stitching, or a combination of these techniques. Replacing an entire panel requires the stitching around the old panel to be removed, and a new panel to be sewn in with the appropriate technique, thread, and stitch pattern.

Licensing
Depending on the size of the balloon, location, and intended use, hot air balloons and their pilots need to comply with a variety of regulations.

Balloons

As with other aircraft in the US, balloons must be registered (have an N-number), have an airworthiness certificate, and pass annual inspections. Balloons below a certain size (empty weight of less than 155 pounds or 70 kg including envelope, basket, burners and empty fuel tanks) can be used as an ultralight aircraft.

Pilots

In Australia
In Australia, private balloon pilots are managed by the Australian Ballooning Federation
and typically become members of regional hot air ballooning clubs. Commercial operations carrying fare paying passengers or charging for promotional flights must operate under an Air Operators Certificate from the Australian Civil Aviation and Safety Authority (CASA) with a nominated Chief Pilot. Pilots must have different degrees of experience before they are allowed to progress to larger balloons. Hot air balloons must be registered aircraft with CASA and are subject to regular airworthiness checks by authorised personnel.

In the UK
In the UK, the person in command must hold a valid Private Pilot's Licence issued by the Civil Aviation Authority specifically for ballooning; this is known as the PPL(B). There are two types of commercial balloon licences: CPL(B) Restricted and CPL(B) (Full). The CPL(B) Restricted is required if the pilot is undertaking work for a sponsor or being paid by an external agent to operate a balloon. The pilot can fly a sponsored balloon with everything paid for with a PPL unless asked to attend any event. Then a CPL(B) Restricted is required. The CPL(B) is required if the pilot is flying passengers for money. The balloon then needs a transport category C of A (certificate of air worthiness). If the pilot is only flying sponsor's guests and not charging money for flying other passengers, then the pilot is exempted from holding an AOC (air operator's certificate) though a copy of it is required. For passenger flying the balloon also requires a maintenance log.

In the United States
In the United States, a pilot of a hot air balloon must have a pilot certificate from the Federal Aviation Administration (FAA), carrying the rating of "Lighter-than-air free balloon", and unless the pilot is also qualified to fly gas balloons, will also carry this limitation: "Limited to hot-air balloons with airborne heater". A pilot does not need a license to fly an ultralight aircraft, but training is highly advised, and some hot-air balloons meet the criteria.

To carry paying passengers for hire (and attend some balloon festivals), a pilot must have a commercial pilot certificate. Commercial hot air balloon pilots may also act as hot air balloon flight instructors. While most balloon pilots fly for the pure joy of floating through the air, many are able to make a living as a professional balloon pilot. Some professional pilots fly commercial passenger sightseeing flights, while others fly corporate advertising balloons.

Accidents and incidents

 1989 Alice Springs hot air balloon crash: On 13 August 1989, two hot air balloons collided at Alice Springs, Northern Territory, Australia, causing one to fall, killing all 13 people on board.
 2011 Somerset hot air balloon crash: On 1 January 2011, a hot air balloon attempting a high-altitude flight crashed at Pratten's Bowls Club in Westfield, Somerset, near Bath, England, killing both people on board.
 2012 Carterton hot air balloon crash: On 7 January 2012, a hot air balloon collided with a power line, caught fire and crashed at Carterton, North Island, New Zealand, killing all 11 people on board.
 2012 Ljubljana Marshes hot air balloon crash: On 23 August 2012, a storm blew a hot air balloon to the ground, causing it to catch fire on impact near Ljubljana, Slovenia. The crash killed 6 of the 32 people on board, and injured the other 26.
 2013 Luxor hot air balloon crash: On 26 February 2013, a hot air balloon carrying foreign tourists ignited and crashed near the ancient city of Luxor, Egypt, killing 19 of the 21 people on board, making it the deadliest balloon accident in history.
 2016 Lockhart hot air balloon crash: On 30 July 2016, a hot air balloon carrying 16 people caught fire and crashed near Lockhart, Texas. There were no survivors.
 2021 Albuquerque hot air balloon crash: On 26 June 2021, a hot air balloon carrying five people made contact with a power line and crashed in Albuquerque, New Mexico. All five people on board died as a result of the accident.

Manufacturers

The largest manufacturer of hot air balloons is Cameron Balloons of Bristol, England, which also owns Lindstrand Balloons of Oswestry, England. Cameron Balloons, Lindstrand Balloons and another English balloon manufacturing company Thunder and Colt (since acquired by Cameron) have been innovators and developers of special shaped balloons. These hot-air balloons use the same principle of lift as conventional inverted teardrop-shaped balloons, but often sections of the special balloon envelope shape do not contribute to the balloon's ability to stay aloft.

The second largest manufacturer of hot air balloons is Ultramagic company, based in Spain, which produces from 80 to 120 balloons per year. Ultramagic can produce very large balloons, such as the N-500 that accommodates as many as 27 persons in the basket, and has also produced many balloons with special shapes, as well as cold-air inflatables.

One of the three largest companies in the world is Kubicek Balloons. From its factory in Brno, Czechia the company ships its products worldwide. Produces from 100 to 115 balloons per year. Kubicek company also focus on special shape balloons, FAA/EASA type certified and are delivered with a Standard Airworthiness Certificate.

In the USA Aerostar International, Inc. of Sioux Falls, South Dakota was North America's largest balloon manufacturer and a close second in world manufacturing before ceasing to build balloons in January 2007. The oldest U.S. certified manufacturer is now Adams Balloons out of Albuquerque, New Mexico. Firefly Balloons, formerly The Balloon Works, is a manufacturer of hot air balloons in Statesville, North Carolina. Another manufacturer is Head Balloons, Inc. of Helen, Georgia.

The major manufacturers in Canada are Sundance Balloons and Fantasy Sky Promotions. Other manufacturers include Kavanagh Balloons of Australia, Schroeder Fire Balloons of Germany, Kubicek Balloons of the Czech Republic, and LLopis Balloons of France.

See also

 Barrage balloon
 Blimp
 Cinebulle
 Cluster ballooning
 Espionage balloon
 Gas balloon
 High-altitude balloon
 History of military ballooning
 Hot air balloon festival
 Hot air ballooning
 Observation balloon
 Research balloon
 Skyhook balloon

References

 Needham, Joseph (1986). Science and Civilization in China: Volume 4, Physics and Physical Technology, Part 2, Mechanical Engineering. Taipei: Caves Books Ltd.

External links

General ballooning sites
 Hot Air Ballooning – How balloons fly, list of balloon clubs, free classified ads for balloonists
 Hot Air Balloon Web Links

Balloons (aeronautics)
Airship technology
Symbols of New Mexico
French inventions
18th-century inventions

ang:Ballōn (lyftcræft)#Hātlyftballōn